Unterriexingen is a village in the district of Ludwigsburg, Baden-Württemberg, Germany. By 1973 it was incorporated to the town of Markgröningen.

Geography

Geology
Unterriexingen lies on a by the Glems split  terrace of the Enz, which rises to the south and was covered by a glacial Loess layer.

Location and route network
The village lies on the northern edge of the Strohgäu about four kilometers north of Markgröningen. Through  Unterriexingen flows the  Glems. About 400 meters below the town the Glems opens in the Enz.

Neighbouring
Around Unterriexingen are the settlements of Großsachsenheim, Untermberg, Markgröningen, Talhausen, Aichholzhof,  Pulverdingen, Enzweihingen, Leinfelder Hof and Oberriexingen (from the north clockwise).

Sons and daughters of the town
 August Ludwig Reyscher (born 1802 in the rectory; died in Cannstatt 1880), lawyer, legal scholars and politician (Landtag and Reichstag),  'the only honorary citizen'  of Unterriexingen (appointment on 24 December 1842). He left a description of his youth in Unterriexingen 
 Ulrich Noack (born 1956), lawyer and a professor at the University of Düsseldorf.

References

Former municipalities in Baden-Württemberg
Ludwigsburg (district)